Thomas Hedvin Byberg (18 September 1916 – 13 October 1998) born in Hommelvik was a Norwegian speed skater. He represented Hommelvik Idrettslag and Trondhjems Skøiteklub.

At the 1948 Winter Olympics in St. Moritz, Byberg won a silver medal on 500 m. The time 43.2 was one tenth of a second behind his fellow Norwegian team member Finn Helgesen. The silver medal was shared with two Americans, Ken Bartholomew and Bob Fitzgerald.

Personal records
43.2 - 1:34.0 - 2:23.7 - 5:12.9 - 8:51.9 - 18:49.1

External links
Thomas Byberg on SkateResults.com

1916 births
1998 deaths
Norwegian male speed skaters
Olympic speed skaters of Norway
Olympic silver medalists for Norway
Speed skaters at the 1948 Winter Olympics
Olympic medalists in speed skating
Medalists at the 1948 Winter Olympics
People from Malvik
Sportspeople from Trøndelag
20th-century Norwegian people